Potulatenses was a Dacian or Getian tribe.

See also
List of ancient cities in Thrace and Dacia

References

External links 

Ancient tribes in Romania
Dacian tribes
Getic tribes